Tipik is a Belgian national television channel, owned and operated by the French-language public-service broadcasting organization RTBF.

History

From RTbis to Télé 2 
On March 26, 1977, RTB launched a second television channel called RTBis, which only broadcast on Monday and Wednesday from 8 pm to 10 pm airing programs aimed at a restricted audience, such as Walloon-language plays and cultural or educational programmes, but also reruns of successful series. Although it was officially created to broadcast regional programs produced by RTB's two regional TV centers (Charleroi and Liège), adult education programs and service sections, the second channel aimed to occupy the old network of black and white transmitters of the first channel, converted to color, so that no commercial station could claim it. RTBis relayed RTB1 programs most of the time, which made it attractive by broadcasting popular of soap operas, movies, variety shows and game shows, although it mostly tried to be complementary, without being specialized, by releasing space and time for full relays of events such as figure skating, tennis tournaments, and the Queen Elisabeth Competition.

RTBF renamed it Télé 2 at the end of 1979 and it adopts an event-based schedule mainly focused on sports.

On October 16, 1983, a wind of 130 km/h damages one of the  RTBF pylons in Wavre, which deprives the access of the channel to 100,000 viewers for one year.

The RTBF activity report submitted in 1984 to the Parliament of the French Community presented several options concerning the future of Télé 2. It was a question of making it either a pay television channel or of reinforcing it in its own right in the regional dimension, either to make it a sports, event and entertainment channel, or to make a "sport events" channel time it valued RTBF1's own production at peak times.

Télé 2 disappears on March 20, 1988, to leave its channel to the new channel Télé 21.

Télé 21, reformats and RTBF La Deux
On March 21, 1988, RTBF launched Télé 21 on its second network, a new second full-fledged channel on 30 November 2012 that took its name from the youth radio station Radio 21, whose spirit and dynamism it wanted to capture on television. It no longer relayed the first channel, except for their news simulcast with sign language.

In the autumn of 1989, Télé 21, whose ratings fluctuated from high to low (from 16 to 18% to less than 0.85), is repositioned as the channel of events and the repeats of very expensive programmes that a good part of the public could not follow on RTBF1. It also rebroadcast the main evening news of the first channel at 10pm. All its staff was transferred to RTBF1 and RTBF hopes to save 100 million francs.

At the beginning of 1992, the RTBF general director, Robert Stéphane, submitted to the board of directors the idea of remodeling Télé 21, whose audience was moribund, by associating tele 2 it with Eurosport or Canal J. He then contemplates the break-up of Télé 21 into three channels: a cultural one, a regional one and a sports one. Arte 21 would broadcast the cultural programs of the Franco-German channel Arte, but with Belgian cultural opt-outs. Also, during the Queen Elisabeth competition, the evenings would be RTBF opt-outs. Euro 21 would be a European regional that would concretise FR3's approachment with RTBF, but the FR3 news slots would be replaced by the rebroadcasting of the regional news bulletin and by RTBF's Journal Télévisé. Finally, Eurosport, following convention involving RTBF, the European Broadcasting Union and TF1, would broadcast Eurosport's French programs and make opt-outs to broadcast Belgian sports.

Two of these three projects were taking shape. RTBF signed a partnership agreement with Arte GEIE on 4 February 1993, which enabled it to broadcast the French version of the programs of the Franco-German cultural channel every day at 7pm on Télé 21 and to offer 50 hours of Belgian programs in the service. Arte. Arte/21 started its programs on March 21, 1993, completed the start-up at 3:30pm until the start of Arte at 7pm with RTBF cultural programs and the children's program Nouba Nouba. The Télé 21 sports programs that no longer have their place in this program are grouped together on a new sports mini-channel called Sports 21, which continued broadcasting major sporting events live, but remains primarily as the relay of the first channel including news from RTBF1 with sign language translation every evening at 7:30pm, sports reports already scheduled previously and the replay of the weekend in sports on Sunday evening. The network of transmitters of Télé 21 is split to broadcast the two channels, Arte/21 incorporating most of the transmitters of Télé 21 and its channel on cable television networks. Sports 21 programs are transmitted by other transmitters and another channel on cable.

The partnership agreement between RTBF and Arte is suspended on March 28, 1994, ending the broadcast of Arte/21 and Sports 21. Télé 21 is then aired under the simple name of 21 in its original format plus children's programs like Ici Bla-Bla, also broadcast on RTBF1. At the same time, the late edition of Journal Télévisé began airing live on that channel instead of its sister channel, RTBF1.

On 1 March 1997, Télé 21 divides its program offerings between La Deux, a multicast channel for cultural programs, documentaries and the reception channel for non-sporting live events (Parliamentary Committees, Queen Elisabeth Music Competition for example) and Eurosport 21 which offers windows of sports programs produced by RTBF, inserted in the complete program of Eurosport France.

On 1 March 1997, RTBF 21 split for the second time, but this time, it was known as Eurosport 21, which became more of an events channel and simulcast with Eurosport on some days. Because of this several programmes moved to a new channel called RTBF La 2, which took over this frequency. RTBF La 2's programming consists of documentaries, cultural, live sports or non-sports coverage. During the FIFA World Cup 1998  RTBF decided to air all matches on its two main channels, La 1 and La 2. So that the wider public had access to the full coverage, it later redistributed to transmitters that transmitted La Une and La Deux on cable networks and also by analogue terrestrial and radio, on the whole territory of the French Community of Belgium. This scheme continued after the World Cup, by the Board of Directors on July 13, 1998. RTBF Eurosport 21 ceased transmission in February 1999, when a contract between RTBF and Eurosport was broken and caused all sports content to be broadcast on both free-to-air channels, La 1 and La 2.

La Deux (2001–2020)
On 1 November 2001, Carine Bratzlavsky was designated to draft a reformatting of the channel. Bratzlavsky had been production coordinator of Arte-Belgium, the interface created between the RTBF and the team of the European cultural channel, since 1995. Previously Bratzlavsky was in charge of the second channel of the RTBF, at the time called Télé 21.

In December 2001, while working on the RTBF news program schedules for the start of January 2002, the date of 21 March is advanced to re-launch the new version of La Deux. However, following the resignation of the director-general of RTBF, Christian Druitte, doubts were raised about the timing and a delay was considered. In March, the information was confirmed: the new La Deux would be launched in September, and September 2 was finally fixed as the launch date. The aim was to break the image unmethodical or catchall, La Deux, giving it a strong identity, and making a channel of its own. The channel was renamed La Deux instead of La 2, and adopted a new round logo. The exterior of the ident is fully reviewed, and plays on the colours to distinguish between time slots for children (yellow tones), adolescents (greens) and adults (mauve and purple tones). The whole thing is accompanied by a sound design and ident produced by Marc Moulin.

Besides maintaining old programs, such as Ici Bla-Bla (for children), many new programs are produced. The show G'nôme, aimed at 9–14 years, followed by Tu passes quand tu veux (produced by Barbara Louys and hosted by two newcomers: Maureen Louys and David Antoine), whose target audience are teenagers. Also note: the debut of Screen (movie block), Clips en ligne, or to Extratime (dedicated to urban or indoor sports, martial arts, etc.). The show also aired the French TV channel Téva's programme Sex in the TV.

On 26 January 2004, together with RTBF's main channel La Une, La Deux changes its look and logo again and reorganizes its programming in complementarity with La Une. In December 2005, the channel switches to 16:9 format completely.

In 2007, RTBF launched a third channel, La Trois and an international channel, RTBF Sat.

On 15 February 2010, RTBF Sat ceased transmission. The children's programming block Ici Bla Bla stopped in June 2010, to be replaced by Ouftivi, the new RTBF children brand, broadcast all day on La Trois since 26 September 2010.

In March 2011, RTBF analogue transmitters ceased transmissions.

Tipik, a unified young adult media
From 7 September 2020, La Deux merged with RTBF's youth radio station Pure to form a new brand for young people called Tipik. Tipik is available on TV as a channel replacing La Deux, on radio replacing Pure, and online.

PureVision, the TV channel version of the radio Pure, rebranded as TipikVision at the same time.

Programming 
La Deux's programming consists of talkshows, local dramas, dramas from the US and the UK, news, sports, movies, current affairs and also youth programmes, complementing RTBF's main channel, La Une. La Deux is also considered to be the equivalent to its Flemish (Dutch-language) counterpart, VRT Canvas, which also follows the same programming structure.

Some programmes from the French public channels, France 2 and France 3 are also being broadcast on this channel.

Following the arrival of Yves Bigot, former director of entertainment for France 2, as the program director of RTBF, the programming of the channel has undergone a revamp with the following characteristics:

 Transferring American cult series from La Une to La Deux.
 Broadcasting American soap operas in the afternoon.
 Thursday evening is the best evening of humor with the broadcasting of French comedy performances.
 Tuesday, Wednesday and Friday nights are reserved for movies with a bonus and decrypting hosted by Cathy Immelen, the "Miss Cinema" of the RTBF, following each film.
 Mondays & Sunday nights are reserved for documentaries.
 The youth programme Bla-Bla evolves with the use of a virtual set.

The channel which previously lacked an identity and variable programming now runs on specific themes:
 Documentary
 Series and cult serials
 Cinema for moviegoers
 Comedy
 Culture, music and society
 Sports

Since 7 September 2020, Tipik targets young adults.

News 
Prior to the launch of La Trois on 30 November 2007, La Deux previously simulcast its main channel La Une's 19:30 news bulletins in sign language. Now, La Deux no longer simulcast its main channel La Une's bulletins.

From 1994 to 2000, La Deux aired JT Soir, alternating with its sister channel, La Une on some days, which La Une also broadcast this edition as a rerun, prior to closedown.

In 2000, JT Soir began broadcasting daily on RTBF La Deux and has continued to do so today. Since 2006, La Deux aired Le 12 Minutes. Every night, it is presented by Eric Boever.

On 21 March 2011, as part of RTBF's major revamp in their news broadcasts and new intros, La Deux later premiered another bulletin for this channel, Le 15 Minutes, which is currently presented by Ophélie Fontana and Jonathan Bradfer, and it is broadcast at 19:00.

Logos and identities

See also 
 RTBF
 La Une
 La Trois
 Arte
 Eurosport
 List of television channels in Belgium

References

External links
 Official site of La Deux
 Official site of RTBF

Television channels in Belgium
Television channels and stations established in 1977
French-language television stations in Belgium